The Black sermonic tradition, or Black preaching tradition, is an approach to sermon (or homily) construction and delivery practiced primarily among African Americans in the Black Church. The tradition seeks to preach messages that appeal to both the intellect and the emotive dimensions of humanity. The tradition finds its roots in the painful experiences of blacks during slavery in the United States, as well as experiences during the Jim Crow era and subsequent discrimination.

Aspects 
Scholars and practitioners have widely recognized four elements of the tradition, which widely continue to the modern day. Firstly, the preaching emphasizes the preacher's freedom to be his or her authentic black self and not have to front a false persona to appease certain expectations of members of the dominant society.

Secondly, the preaching is characterized by a variety of rhetorical embellishments including often jarring hyperbole, corresponding body language, and musicality in vocalizations. Thirdly, it is often marked by challenges to dominant societal structures and emphasizes how individuals may be transformed by having a relationship with God. Finally, there is a recognition of historical continuity with ancestors and their struggles.

Some African American poetry and other literature is organized by the pattern of the sermonic tradition.

Whooping 
Raboteau describes a common style of black preaching called "whooping", which first developed in the early 19th century, and became common throughout the 20th and into the 21st centuries:The preacher begins calmly, speaking in conversational, if oratorical and occasionally grandiloquent, prose; he then gradually begins to speak more rapidly, excitedly, and to chant his words and time to a regular beat; finally, he reaches an emotional peak in which the chanted speech becomes tonal and merges with the singing, clapping, and shouting of the congregation.This aspect of Black preaching often utilizes what is called "preaching chords", bombastic interpolations played on an organ and juxtaposed with the preacher's emphatic lines.

See also
Imprecations (Bible)
Black church
Preaching Chords

References

Hubbard, Don (1996). The Sermon and the African American Literary Imagination, University of Missouri Press,  
LaRue, Cleophus J. (1999). The Heart Of Black Preaching, John Knox Press,  
Lyndrey A. Niles, "Rhetorical Characteristics of Traditional Black Preaching", Journal of Black Studies, Vol. 15, No. 1, Sep., 1984, pp. 41–52. 
Mitchell, Henry H. (1990). Black Preaching: The Recovery of a Powerful Art, Abingdon Press, 
Mitchell, Henry H. (2004). Black Church Beginnings: The Long-Hidden Realities of the First Years, Wm. B. Eerdmans Pub.,  
Moyd, Olin P. (1995). The Sacred Art: Preaching & Theology in the African American Tradition, Judson Press,  
Walter Pitts, "West African Poetics in the Black Preaching Style", American Speech, Vol. 64, No. 2 (Summer, 1989), pp. 137–149.

External links
 "SoulPreaching.Com - Celebrating the African American Preaching Tradition"
 "African American Lectionary"



African-American Christianity
Black studies
Sermons